Madeleine Rolland (October 17, 1872 – April 1, 1960) was a French translator and peace activist. She was affiliated with the French section of the Women's International League for Peace and Freedom (WILPF).

Biography
Madeleine Rolland was born in Clamecy, October 17, 1872.

She passed the Agrégation in English in 1901, and then taught in Paris at the Guild (future Franco-British Institute).

From 1919, she filled the roles of secretary and interpreter for her brother, Romain Rolland. That same year, she joined WILPF.

Rolland was a translator, most notably of Tess of the d'Urbervilles by Thomas Hardy, but also  by Rabindranath Tagore.

Passionate about India and mastering the English language, it was Madeleine who made it possible for her brother, Romain, to come into contact with Rabindranath Tagore and Mahatma Gandhi. In addition, she had a rich epistolary correspondence with Madeleine Slade.

She spent the Occupation in Dijon, with Yvonne Paquet.

Madeleine Rolland died in Créteil, April 1, 1960.

See also
 List of peace activists

References

Bibliography 
 
 
 

1872 births
1960 deaths
People from Nièvre
French pacifists
20th-century French translators
French–English translators
Women's International League for Peace and Freedom people